Ectatosia is a genus of longhorn beetles of the subfamily Lamiinae, containing the following species:

 Ectatosia invitticollis Breuning, 1961
 Ectatosia maculosa Fisher, 1935
 Ectatosia moorei Pascoe, 1857
 Ectatosia sumatrensis Gahan, 1907

References

Desmiphorini